Helmont House is a high-rise hotel and office building in Cardiff, Wales. Completed in 1984, the  building has 12 floors and is the 15th-tallest building in Cardiff. The building was renovated in 2009 into a 200-room Premier Inn hotel.

The building was previously occupied by British Gas and was one of the largest office buildings in Cardiff, and is yards away from Cardiff Queen Street railway station.

History
When British Gas was privatised in 1986, fewer than 600 people were employed in the Cardiff office. In 1998 the Cardiff regional headquarters became the National Sales Centre for Britain. Prior to relocation, 2,400 people were employed at Helmont House, two thirds of which were call centre staff, with a further 800 working in the field.

In 2009 the building's occupier, British Gas, relocated its Wales headquarters to a new  office site at the nearby Callaghan Square, in the south of Cardiff city centre. Helmont House was acquired by the property company Rightacres when the building's value was estimated at over £10m. Rightacres had previously acquired Holland House in Cardiff from Lloyds TSB, which was converted into a Mercure Hotel.

The building was renovated in 2009 into a 200-room Premier Inn hotel on a 25-year lease after a wide range search by the company for a location in central Cardiff. The hotel was the largest in the city in terms of beds.

 of Helmont House remains dedicated to office space,  of which is let to law firm NewLaw Solicitors.

The building featured in episodes of the television programmes Doctor Who ("Partners in Crime") and Torchwood in 2007. Both series are filmed and produced in Cardiff.

Architecture
The angular look of Helmont House was inspired by the Cubist art movement which was dominated by artists Pablo Picasso and Georges Braque.

Location
Helmont House is in close proximity to the main shopping areas including Queen Street and St David's. Cardiff Queen Street railway station is within a short walk, as are the Cardiff Central Bus and Railway Stations. The building is one of the closest hotels to the Cardiff International Arena.

See also
List of tallest buildings in Cardiff

References

External links
Premier Inn - Cardiff City Centre
NewLaw Legal Ltd T/A New Law Solicitors
Skyscraper News - Helmont House
Property Week article on the purchase of Helmont House
WalesOnline - British Gas moves 1,200-staff HQ

Landmarks in Cardiff
Hotels in Cardiff
Office buildings in Cardiff
Office buildings completed in 1984